Wuhan Yangtze River Shipping Center is a supertall skyscraper under construction in Wuhan, Hubei, China. Construction started in 2014 and is currently topped out, the building is expected to be completed in 2022.

See also
List of tallest buildings in Wuhan

References

Buildings and structures under construction in China
Skyscraper office buildings in Wuhan
Skyscraper hotels in Wuhan
Skyscrapers in Wuhan